The Vanguard-class multirole warship is a design proposal by Kongsberg Gruppen of Norway for a design of warship based on commercial design and shipbuilding principles. It is intended to meet a requirement for a mix of "Search & Rescue, Harbor and Assets Protection, Subsea Survey, Exercising Authority and Sovereignty, Anti-Access/Area Denial, Anti-Submarine Warfare and Mine Clearance, and Detection and Disposal."

Design and description 
Kongsberg collaborated with Salt Ship Design of Leirvik, Norway to develop the conceptual designs. The design is intended to be built in commercial shipyards at a considerable cost saving over dedicated naval shipyards, taking as little as two years to build.

The multirole ship has positions for role-specific ISO containers that can be swapped to change roles. The design has one helicopter spot at the back, for up to medium-sized aircraft. There is no hangar. A fully enclosed boat deck at roughly the middle of the ship's length opens at both sides to allow gantry cranes to deploy both sides to lower boats to the water. Additionally, a smaller seaboat is sited on the port side. The two propellers are above the keel. Two bow thrusters are sited just behind the bulbous bow. With likely limited speed requirements, the fuel consumption is likely to be low.

Armament 
Depictions of the ship show a single mount for a small calibre gun on the foredeck.

Crew 
Crew numbers could be as few as 16 to 20 in some role configurations.

Royal Norwegian Navy 
Following the collision and sinking of the Royal Norwegian Navy ship  in November 2018, the repair cost has been estimated at 13 billion Kroner (USD$1.4 billion), nearly three times the cost of the original build, there has been speculation that the Navy would instead invest in another class of ships. Vanguard is intended to meet this as-yet unstated requirement.

References

External links 

 Kongsberg Vanguard
 Vanguard unveiled

Proposed ships